The Mining Journal is the predominant daily newspaper of Marquette, Michigan, and the Upper Peninsula of Michigan.

Like most market-dominant daily papers, the MJ is a six-day paper. The Mining Journal is distributed over a wide area, in part because Marquette is the largest city for a considerable radius in any direction. The MJ can be found in 14 of the 15 Upper Peninsula counties on Sunday; distribution on other days is limited because of budget reductions. The Mining Journal either maintains bureaus in many of the cities of the U.P., or shares news coverage with other Ogden owned papers.

In August 2019, the Journal announced that they would be discontinuing the Sunday print edition and become a 6-day a week newspaper.

Notes

External links
 The Mining Journal official site

Newspapers published in Michigan
Marquette County, Michigan
Newspapers established in 1841
1841 establishments in Michigan